Darisiyeh-ye Vosta (also Romanized as Darīsīyeh-e Vosţá; also known as Dirsiyeh) is a village in Darkhoveyn Rural District, in the Central District of Shadegan County, Khuzestan Province, Iran. At the 2006 census, its population was 851, in 152 families.

References 

Populated places in Shadegan County